Elizabeth Wilson Hanes (née Elizabeth Slater Wilson, born 1978) is an American lawyer from Virginia who serves as a United States district judge for the United States District Court for the Eastern District of Virginia. She previously served as a United States magistrate judge of the same court.

Early life and education 

Hanes was born in 1978 in Roanoke, Virginia. She received her Bachelor of Arts from the University of Richmond, cum laude, in 2000 and her Juris Doctor from the University of Richmond School of Law, summa cum laude, in 2007.

Career 

After completing law school, Hanes served as a law clerk for Judge Joseph R. Goodwin of the United States District Court for the Southern District of West Virginia from 2007 to 2008, and then as a law clerk for Judge Robert Bruce King of the United States Court of Appeals for the Fourth Circuit from 2008 to 2009. From 2009 to 2016, she was an assistant federal public defender in the Eastern District of Virginia. She then joined the firm Consumer Litigation Associates, P.C. in Newport News, Virginia, where she worked as a civil litigator until her appointment as a magistrate judge in 2020. Hanes served on the Criminal Justice Act Panel Committee for the Richmond Division of the United States District Court for the Eastern District of Virginia.

Federal judicial service 

Hanes was sworn in as a magistrate judge for the Eastern District of Virginia on June 15, 2020. She sat with the court's Richmond division. On November 4, 2021, Senators Mark Warner and Tim Kaine recommended Hanes to fill a vacancy on the Eastern District of Virginia created by Judge John A. Gibney Jr., who assumed senior status on November 1, 2021. On April 27, 2022, President Joe Biden announced his intent to nominate Hanes to serve as a United States district judge of the United States District Court for the Eastern District of Virginia. On May 19, 2022, her nomination was sent to the Senate. A hearing on her nomination was held before the Senate Judiciary Committee on June 22, 2022. On July 21, 2022, her nomination was reported out of committee by a 15–7 vote. On August 1, 2022, the United States Senate invoked cloture on her nomination by a 56–33 vote. On August 2, 2022, her nomination was confirmed by a 59–37 vote. She received her judicial commission on August 5, 2022.

References

External links 

1978 births
Living people
21st-century American judges
21st-century American women lawyers
21st-century American lawyers
21st-century American women judges
Judges of the United States District Court for the Eastern District of Virginia
People from Roanoke, Virginia
Public defenders
Virginia lawyers
West Virginia lawyers
United States district court judges appointed by Joe Biden
United States magistrate judges
University of Richmond alumni